Jan Jensen (born August 19, 1971) is a retired Danish ice hockey goaltender who participated at the 2003 and 2004 IIHF World Championships as a member of the Denmark men's national ice hockey team.

External links

1971 births
AaB Ishockey players
Danish ice hockey goaltenders
EfB Ishockey players
Living people
Peterborough Pirates players
San Diego Barracudas players
Wipptal Broncos players
Vojens IK players